Yours Truly, Blake (French: Votre dévoué Blake) is a 1954 French comedy crime film directed by Jean Laviron and Jerome Epstein and starring Eddie Constantine, Danielle Godet and Simone Paris. The film's sets were designed by Robert Clavel.

Plot
While spending a night out in Paris an American airline pilot gets entangled with a beautiful nightclub performer and soon finds himself under suspicion of murder.

Cast
 Eddie Constantine as Larry Blake - un pilote de ligne américain  
 Danielle Godet as Michèle Marley aka Marion Miller  
 Simone Paris as Elyane de Broussac  
 Gil Delamare as Georges  
 Colette Deréal as Stella  
 Dora Doll as Isabelle  
 Jacques Dynam as Gaston  
 Robert Dalban as L'inspecteur Tessier  
 Henri Cogan as Sam 
 Jack Ary as L'inspecteur Brevan  
 Marcel Charvey as Laurent 
 Henry Belly as L'assistant  
 Maurice Chevit as Un complice  
 Robert Hirsch as Saganoff  
 Bob Ingarao as Le premier complice  
 Palmyre Levasseur as La concierge de Michèle  
 Yette Lucas as La bistrote 
 Roger Vincent as Le portier

References

Bibliography 
 Michel Marie. The French New Wave: An Artistic School. John Wiley & Sons, 2008.

External links 
 

1950s crime comedy films
French crime comedy films
1954 films
1950s French-language films
Films directed by Jean Laviron
Films set in Paris
1954 comedy films
French black-and-white films
1950s French films